Christian Ingerslev Baastrup (24 January 1885, in Copenhagen – 24 October 1950, in Copenhagen) was a Danish physician specializing in radiology. The Baastrup's sign is named after him.

External links
Christian Ingerslev Baastrup

1885 births
1950 deaths
Danish radiologists
People from Copenhagen
University of Copenhagen alumni